The Universidad del Norte de Santo Tomás de Aquino (Saint Thomas Aquinas North University, UNSTA) is a Catholic university located in San Miguel de Tucumán, Tucumán province, Argentina.

External links

 Official website
 Studies

Catholic universities and colleges in Argentina
North
Buildings and structures in San Miguel de Tucumán
Educational institutions established in 1965
Universities in Tucumán Province
1965 establishments in Argentina